Carl-Erik Asplund (born 14 September 1923) is a Swedish speed skater who won a bronze medal in the 10000 m event at the 1952 Olympics. In the 1500 metres event he finished fourth and in the 5000 metres competition he finished sixth.

Asplund specialized in long distances and won medals in the 5000 and 10000 m at European and world championships. He never finished within the podium overall; in 1951 he was fourth at the European Championships and sixth at the world championships. Nationally he won nine Swedish titles: 1500 m (1951–1953), 3000 m (1951–1952), 5000 m (1951–1952) and 10,000 m (1951, 1953). In 1953, he won the discontinued Nordic championship, having finished second in 1951.

References

1923 births
Living people
Swedish male speed skaters
Olympic speed skaters of Sweden
Speed skaters at the 1952 Winter Olympics
Olympic bronze medalists for Sweden
Olympic medalists in speed skating
Medalists at the 1952 Winter Olympics
20th-century Swedish people